The Henley Passport Index (abbreviation: HPI) is a global ranking of countries according to the travel freedom enjoyed by the holders of that country's ordinary passport for its citizens. It started in 2006 as Henley & Partners Visa Restrictions Index (HVRI) and was modified and renamed in January 2018.

The site provides annual ranking for 199 passports of the world according to the number of countries their holders can travel to visa-free. The number of countries that a specific passport can access becomes its visa-free 'score'. In collaboration with the International Air Transport Association (IATA), and based on official data from their global database Henley & Partners has analysed the visa regulations of the vast majority of the countries and territories in the world since 2006.

Definition of the Index
The Henley Passport index (HPI) ranks passports according to how many destinations can be reached using a particular country's ordinary passport without requiring a prior visa ('visa-free'). The ranking includes a total of 199 passports in its survey, against 227 travel destinations in the world, which are countries, territories, and micro-states.

All distinct destination countries and territories in the IATA database are considered. However, since not all territories issue passports, there are far fewer passports ranked than destinations against which queries are made.

Methodology
To determine the score for each country or territory, its passport is checked against the IATA database in several steps:

 Each of the 199 passports on the list, is checked against all 227 possible travel destinations for which travel restriction information exists in the IATA database. The score is updated throughout the year as conditions change.
 Each query must satisfy certain conditions:
 passport is issued in the country of nationality
 passport holder is an adult citizen of the country which issued the passport and a lone traveller, not part of a tourist group
 entry is sought for tourism or business
 the stay is a minimum of three days
 Further conditions include:
 queries are made only for holders of normal passports rather than diplomatic, service, emergency, or temporary passports and other travel documents are disregarded
 passport holders do not meet any complex requirements for entry (for example, possessing a government-issued letter, translations, or empty pages)
 passport holders have all necessary vaccinations and certificates;
 passport holders are arriving at and departing from the same airport
 passport holders are seeking a short stay rather than a transit
 the port of entry is a major city or capital, in cases where this is required
 requirements by the destination country or territory regarding a particular length of validity of passports are disregarded
 passport holders meet all basic requirements for entry (for example, holding a hotel reservation or having proof of sufficient funds or return tickets)
 advance passenger information and advance approval to board are not considered to be a visa requirement or travel restriction, neither is the requirement to pay airport tax
 If no visa is required for passport holders from a particular country or territory to enter the destination, then that passport scores 1. [The passport also scores 1 if a visa on arrival, a visitor's permit, or an electronic travel authority (ETA) can be obtained because they do not require pre-departure government approval, perhaps because of specific visa-waiver programs in place.]
 Where visas are needed, or where passport holders have to get government-approved electronic visas (e-Visas) before departure, a score of 0 is given. If passport holders must get government approval before leaving in order to obtain a visa on arrival, this also scores 0.
 The score for each particular passport is then totalled by adding up its scores for all destinations.
 The index does not factor in temporary restrictions or airspace closures.

It is assumed that the visa policies of Greenland and the Faroe Islands are identical to Denmark.

Rankings

2023 Henley Passport Index
As of March 2023, the Japanese and Singaporean passports offer holders visa-free or visa-on-arrival access to a total of 193 countries and territories, with South Korean passports offering 192 visa-free or visa-on-arrival countries and territories to its holders. These rankings were subseuqently followed by Germany and Spain (both at 191) as well as Finland, Italy and Luxembourg (all at 190).

An Afghan passport has once again been labelled by the index as the least powerful passport in the world, with its nationals only able to visit 26 destinations visa-free. This was followed by the Iraq passport at 28.

2022 Henley Passport Index

As of 2022, a Japanese passport offers its holders visa-free or visa-on-arrival access to a total of 193 countries and territories, with South Korean and Singapore passports each offering 192 visa-free or visa-on-arrival countries and territories to their holders. An American passport offers its holders visa-free or visa-on-arrival access to 186 countries and territories, with the British passport offering 187 visa-free or visa-on-arrival countries and territories to their holders. Canadian and Australian passports each offer their holders visa-free access to 185 countries and territories.

An Afghan passport has once again been labelled by the index as the least powerful passport in the world, with its nationals only able to visit 27 destinations visa-free.

2006–2015
A number of Asian and European countries are notable for their stability over the past decade, and Belgium, France, Italy, Luxembourg, Japan, Singapore, Spain, and Sweden all remain in exactly the same position as 10 years before. The 'Top 10s' were almost identical, with 30 countries in 2015, compared to 26 a decade before. While Liechtenstein dropped, the Czech Republic, Finland, Hungary, Malta, Slovakia, and South Korea all made it into the top 10.

Taiwan, Albania, the United Arab Emirates, Bosnia and Herzegovina, and Serbia all moved up more than 20 places in the Henley & Partners Visa Restrictions Index over the period, while the biggest drops were experienced by Guinea (−32), Liberia (−33), Sierra Leone (−35), and Bolivia (−37).

Older rankings

In the table below, the "access" columns denote the number of visa-free destinations for holders of that passport. 
Unless indicated otherwise, the data in this table is taken from these sources.

See also 
Dimitry Kochenov
 The Passport Index

References

Further reading

External links
 The Henley & Partners Visa Restrictions Index 2016
 Henley & Partners Passport Index
 Henley Passport Index ranking, as of 9 July 2018

Indexes
Travel-related organizations

International travel documents